Antonio de las Alas (October 14, 1889 – October 5, 1983) was a Filipino politician and business leader.

Biography
Antonio de las Alas was an acting Secretary of the Interior, four-term representative of the 1st district of Batangas in the Philippine Legislature, Secretary of Public Works and Communications, a member of the Senate of the Philippines during World War II, and a member of the constitutional convention delegation in 1934 and 1971. His signature is on an unissued 100-peso banknote dated 1944. After the war, he worked in many Filipino companies and institutions. In 1978, he received an Alumni service award. He died at the age of 94 in Illinois in 1983.

Personal life
He married Natividad Lontoc and had twelve children. His eldest daughter Lourdes or "Lily" later married Senator Ambrosio Padilla and had ten children or ten grandchildren for Lolo Antonio.

References 

20th-century Filipino politicians
1983 deaths
Senators of the 1st Congress of the Commonwealth of the Philippines
Members of the Philippine Legislature
Members of the House of Representatives of the Philippines from Batangas
People from Batangas
Filipino collaborators with Imperial Japan
Deputy Speakers of the House of Representatives of the Philippines
Secretaries of the Interior and Local Government of the Philippines
Secretaries of Finance of the Philippines
Secretaries of Public Works and Highways of the Philippines
Quezon administration cabinet members
Laurel administration cabinet members